Alejandro Rodríguez (born 13 July 1978) is a Chilean table tennis player. He competed in the men's doubles event at the 2004 Summer Olympics.

References

1978 births
Living people
Chilean male table tennis players
Olympic table tennis players of Chile
Table tennis players at the 2004 Summer Olympics
Place of birth missing (living people)
21st-century Chilean people